Juodupė (literally: black river) is a small town in Rokiškis district municipality, Lithuania. It is located near  the confluence of Juodupė rivulet with Vyžuona not far from the border with Latvia. According to the 2011 census, its population was 1,769. Juodupė received city rights in 1956, but lost them on December 16, 2002 and became a town.

Juodupė started growing around a wool spinning mill, established in an old windmill in 1907. In 1931 the mill went bankrupt and was bought by "Nemunas" company, which resumed operations. During World War II, the town burned to ground, but was quickly rebuilt. The mill was reconstructed into a large factory, employing over 1,000 people. It almost went bankrupt when Lithuania declared independence in 1990 and severed factory's economic ties with Russia. Today the factory is operated by UAB Baltic Mills and employs over 200 people. Another major employer is a peat extraction company in the nearby Naujasodė village.

References

Towns in Panevėžys County
Towns in Lithuania
Novoalexandrovsky Uyezd